Martin Held (1908–1992) was a German television and film actor.

Partial filmography

 Dark Eyes (1951) - Alexander Grabner
 Homesick for You (1952) - Direktor Petermann
 Canaris Master Spy (1954) - Obergruppenfuehrer Heydrich
 Alibi (1955) - Dr. Kurt Overbeck
 Before Sundown (1956) - Erich Klamroth
 The Captain from Köpenick (1956) - Dr. Obermüller
  (1956) - Falkenstein
 Spy for Germany (1956) - Erich Gimpel
  (1957) - Herbert Burkhardt
 The Fox of Paris (1957) - Gen. Quade
 Nasser Asphalt (Wet Asphalt) (1958) - Cesar Boyd
 My Daughter Patricia (1959) - Heinz Roland, Apotheker
 Roses for the Prosecutor (1959) - Oberstaatsanwalt Dr. Wilhelm Schramm
  (Bumerang) (1960) - Hauptkommissar Stern
 The Last Witness (1960) - Direktor Werner Rameil
 The Marriage of Mr. Mississippi (1961) - Frédéric René Saint-Claude
 The Last of Mrs. Cheyney (1961) - Charles
 The Dream of Lieschen Mueller (1961) - Dr. Schmidt
 Terror After Midnight (1962) - Charles Elgin
  (1962) - Friedrich de Wehrt
 Love Has to Be Learned (1963) - Christoph Mylius
 A Nearly Decent Girl (1963) - Robert Steckler
  (1963) - Rektor
 Condemned to Sin (1964) - Hugo Starosta
 Long Legs, Long Fingers (1966) - Baron Holberg
 The Oldest Profession (1967) - Edouard (segment "Belle époque, La")
  (1967) - Karl Küppes
 Dr. Fabian: Laughing Is the Best Medicine (1969) - Professor Dr. Dr. Felix Spalke
 Gentlemen in White Vests (1970) - Oberlandesgerichtsrat a. D. Herbert Zänker
  (1972) - Professor Hebbel
 Night Flight from Moscow (1973) - Lepke
  (1977) - Prof. Abel Cornelius
  (1978) - Heinrich Johannsen
  (1983, TV film) - Prof. Martin Gollwitz
 Was zu beweisen war (1986, TV film) - Wilhelm Kaiser

References

External links
 

1908 births
1992 deaths
German male film actors
German male television actors
Male actors from Berlin
Grand Crosses with Star and Sash of the Order of Merit of the Federal Republic of Germany
20th-century German male actors
Burials at the Waldfriedhof Zehlendorf